Intervals is a Canadian progressive metal band. Formed in Toronto, Ontario, the band has toured throughout Canada and the United States with bands such as Animals as Leaders, Protest the Hero, Between the Buried and Me and The Contortionist.

Intervals released two EPs, The Space Between (2011) and In Time (2012), and their debut full-length album A Voice Within on March 4, 2014, featuring vocals by Mike Semesky. After the exit of every band member except for guitarist Aaron Marshall, follow-up albums The Shape of Colour (2015), The Way Forward (2017), and Circadian (2020) were released.

History

Formation and The Space Between EP (2011–2012)
Intervals was formed in Toronto, Ontario in 2011 as a creative outlet for guitarist Aaron Marshall after quitting his previous band, "Speak of the Devil". After releasing two songs online ("Still Winning" & "Duality"), Anup, Lukas and Matt joined the band. Their first EP The Space Between was recorded in Aaron's basement, with the exception of Anup who recorded his drums at his own home studio in Frederick, Maryland. The mixing and mastering were done by Adam "Nolly" Getgood of Periphery, and it was released independently on December 20, 2011. At this point, the band attempted to find a vocalist to complete the lineup, but failed to do so.

In Time EP (2012–2013)
With the release of their second EP In Time on October 30, 2012, they were joined by Olly Steele (Monuments) and David Maxim Micic (Destiny Potato) as guest soloists. Sputnik Music gave the EP a 4.0/Excellent rating, suggesting that "if they find a bit more creativity and increase their originality, they have potential to go down in history as one of the best instrumental prog metal bands. As of now, they are still not on the same level as Animals as Leaders." The band released a music video for "Epiphany" on April 25, 2013, via Guitar World promotion and YouTube. Following the success of In Time, the band gained endorsement deals from Ernie Ball Music Man, Pearl Drums, Meinl Cymbals, Toontrack, InTune Guitar Picks, and Gruv Gear. Marshall and Sastry also released playthroughs, as well as lessons for select songs off the EP. On April 18, 2013 it was announced that Matt De Luca would be leaving the band to pursue other projects.

A Voice Within (2013–2015)
On September 14, 2013, Intervals announced they would again be entering the studio with producer Jordan Valeriote (Silverstein, Structures, Counterparts) on November 4 to begin tracking their upcoming release. Following the studio, Intervals were scheduled to tour Europe (January - February 2014) with Protest The Hero, TesseracT, and The Safety Fire. On December 30, it was announced that live bassist Mike Semesky would be changing his role in the band to provide vocals on the new album. The album's bass tracks were handled equally between Marshall and Cameron McLellan (Protest The Hero). The band released Semesky's vocal debut in the form of new single ‘Ephemeral’ via RevolverMag.com, as well as a revelation that the new album would be titled A Voice Within.

Due to the need for Semesky to focus entirely on his vocal performance live, the band hired Henry Selva (formerly of The Human Abstract) as a live bassist for their upcoming european tour, but eventually opted to use the bass in the backing track moving forward.  The band released a second song from the album, "The Escape", on January 23, 2014, and announced that the album would be released on March 4, 2014. On February 26, the band announced that they would be releasing one new song from the album per day until the day of the album's release. The first of these songs was "The Self Surrendered".

Departure, The Shape of Colour, and The Way forward (2015–present)

On November 25, 2014, it was announced that Mike Semesky parted ways with the band, due to Marshall's desire to instrumentally front the band again. An instrumental version of A Voice Within was then released on March 3, 2015. On June 23, three months after, Guyader and Sastry finally announced on Facebook that they decided they would no longer be a part of Intervals without Semesky. According to Marshall's narrative the separation was caused by different expectations as to the direction of the band. However, Sastry and Guyader have both cited that after removing Semesky, Marshall wanted to demote their roles strictly to 'hired guns' in an effort to further rebrand the band as his solo project. After the moral loss of losing Semesky, there was a lack of communication for a few months. In that time Marshall finished the solo record he had already been working on throughout the year. He then booked studio time and new musicians without the rest of the bands knowledge, only communicating all of this to them through an ultimatum days before the studio time was to begin. So Sastry and Guyader opted to leave together.

Marshall's new studio musicians, were then revealed to be bassist Cameron McLellan (Protest The Hero) and drummer Travis Orbin (Darkest Hour, ex-Periphery, Sky Eats Airplane), for the next album. On December 4, 2015, Intervals released The Shape of Colour.

On October 24, 2017, Intervals announced The Way Forward, a new album with McLellan returning to bass, and new drummer Nathan Bulla, who had been playing live with the band until the release. Marshall continues to be the only official member of the band, despite having returning members for tours and studio recordings.

On November 13, 2020, the band released Circadian, which featured collaborations with a number of artists.

Tours 

Participated in The Contortionist's Canadian tour (October 2012)
Participated in a headlining eastern Canadian tour (December 2012)
Participated in support of Between The Buried and Me in Canada (February 2013)
Participated in support of Structures, Texas In July, and Northlane in Canada (April 2013) 
Participated in support of Misery Signals in the United States and Canada (June 2013)
Participated in support of Protest The Hero, TesseracT, and The Safety Fire in Europe & the UK. (January - February 2014)
Participated in support of Protest The Hero, Battlecross and The Safety Fire in America.
Participated in support of Periphery and The Contortionist
Participated in support of Animals As Leaders (summer 2016)
Headlined in Europe with support from Polyphia and Nick Johnston (November 2017)
Headlined in US with support from Jason Richardson, Nick Johnston and Night Verses (January 2018)
Participated in support of The Contortionist in the United States (November 2018)
Participated in support of Veil of Maya in the United States (April 2019)
Headlined in Europe with support from Sithu Aye and The Omnific (June 2019)
Participated in support of Chon and Between The Buried and Me in the United States (November 2019)

Band members
Current members
Aaron Marshall - guitar (2011–present)
Past members
Matt De Luca - bass (2011–2013)
Mike Semesky - vocals (now in Rest Among Ruins, Ordinance, Raunchy, ex-Haunted Shores, ex-Star Monarchy, ex-Memoirs, ex-The HAARP Machine) (2013-2014; live bass, 2013)
Lukas Guyader - guitar (2011–2015)
Anup Sastry - drums, percussion (Marty Friedman, ex-Monuments, ex-Jeff Loomis, ex-Skyharbor) (2011–2015)
Live members
Henry Selva - bass (2014) 
Plini Roessler-Holgate - guitar (Plini) (2016–2018)
Simon Grove - bass (2016–2018)
Sam Jacobs - guitar (2016–present)
Nathan Bulla - drums (2016–present)
Jacob Umansky - bass (2017–present)
Thomas Griggs - guitar (2018–present)
Travis LeVrier - guitar (2019–present)

Timeline

Discography
Studio albums
 A Voice Within (2014)
 The Shape of Colour (2015)
 The Way Forward (2017)
 Circadian (2020)

EPs
 The Space Between (2011)
 In Time (2012)

Singles
 "Epiphany" (2013)
 "Ephemeral" (2013)
 "5-HTP" (2020)

Music videos 
 "Epiphany" (2013)
 "Moment Marauder" (2014)
 "The Escape" (2014)
 "Siren Sound" (2014)
 "I'm Awake" (2016)
 "Libra" (2017)
 "Touch and Go" (2017)
 "Impulsively Responsible (2017)
 "Leave No Stone" (2019)

References

External links

Canadian progressive metal musical groups
Canadian instrumental musical groups
Musical groups established in 2011
2011 establishments in Ontario